The Siberian ibex (Capra sibirica), also known as the Altai ibex, Central Asia(n) ibex, Gobi ibex, Himalayan ibex, Mongolian ibex or Tian Shan ibex, is a species of ibex that lives in central Asia. It has traditionally been treated as a subspecies of the Alpine ibex, and whether it is specifically distinct from other ibex is still not entirely clear. It is the longest and heaviest member of the genus Capra, though its shoulder height is surpassed by the markhor.

Appearance
Siberian ibexes are large and heavily built goats, although individual sizes vary greatly. The nose is straight in profile, the neck short, and the back straight. The neck is also particularly thick and muscular in males, but much less so in females. Both sexes have beards, although the male's beard is more pronounced, and those of females are sometimes absent altogether.

Both sexes have circular rings around their horns that represent annual growth, but males also have large transverse ridges along the front surface. The exact shape of the horns varies considerably between individuals.

The colouration is also variable, from dark brown to light tan, with some reddish individuals. There is usually a stripe of darker hair down the centre of the back and onto the tail, and some males have saddle-like patches on the back in the winter. The undersides are paler, and, in the winter, mature males becoming much darker with white patches. Females and infants are generally more bland in colour than the adult males, and do not always have the stripe down the back. Siberian ibexes typically moult between April and July, developing their paler summer coat, which continues to grow and become darker as the year progresses, reaching the full winter condition around December.

Subspecies
Though some recent authorities treat the species as monotypic, others have recognized four subspecies, based mainly on differences in total size, size of horns and colour of pelage:

 C. s. sibirica (Siberian or Altai Ibex) – Sayan Mountains
 C. s. alaiana (Tian Shan Ibex) – Alay Mountains 
 C. s. hagenbecki (Gobi or Mongolian Ibex) – western Mongolia
 C. s. sakeen (Himalayan Ibex – Pamir Mountains, western Himalayas, India, Afghanistan and Pakistan

Reproduction
The rut takes place from late October to early January. During the rut, the males spend considerable effort courting females, and they are often emaciated from lack of grazing by the time it ends. Courtship lasts for over 30 minutes, and consists of licking, ritualised postures, and flehmen if the female urinates. Males compete for dominance during the rut, rearing up on their hind legs and clashing their horns together.

Gestation lasts 170 to 180 days, and usually results in the birth of a single kid, although twins occur in up to 14% of births, and triplets are born on rare occasions. The horns are visible after about three to four weeks. They begin to eat grass as little as eight days after birth, but do not do so regularly until they are about one month old, and are not fully weaned until six months.

Males are sexually mature at eighteen months, but do not reach their full adult size for nine years. Females first breed in their second year. Males typically live for ten years in the wild, and females for up to seventeen years. They have been reported to live for up to 22 years in captivity.

Behavior
Usually living at high elevations, sometimes at the vegetation line and well above the tree line, Siberian ibexes seek out lower slopes during the winter in search of food. They have also been known to seek out tree lines on hot days, but they do not enter forested areas, preferring to return to their alpine habitat when the weather has cooled. When snow is heavy, they have to paw away snow to reach the vegetation below.

Their diet primarily consists of alpine grasses and herbs. During spring and summer, grasses and sedges form the bulk of their diet, while during winter they eat more tall herbs, and the twigs and needles of trees such as aspen, spruce, juniper, and willow. During the summer, they often visit salt licks. Herds vary in size depending on the local population; about 5-30 is most common, although they can become much larger during the rut. Outside of the rut, most herds are single-sex, although some mixed-sex herds persist throughout the year. Herds spend much of the day grazing, spending an hour or more at each location before moving on.

Males and female exhibit different behaviors in choosing feeding grounds, herd size, and protection. Although there are several herds consisting of both, herds can be divided by sex and food availability. In times of high vegetation, groups are larger with less competition for resources. Since females prioritize health and safety of their offspring, they are more frequently near water sources and spread around elevations with the most nutrient-rich vegetation, as well as increasing their vigilance towards predators.

The main predators of Siberian ibex are Himalayan wolves, dholes, snow leopards, and brown bears; young ibex may also fall prey to lynxes, foxes, and eagles.

Habitat and distribution
Siberian ibexes live mostly above the tree line, in areas of steep slopes and rocky scree. Their habitat consists of a mixture of high altitude steppe, alpine meadows, and regions of semidesert. In Tajikistan, the ibex distribution is controlled by climatic variables such as seasonal temperature and precipitation of warmest quarter.   
Most Siberian ibexes are seen in central and northern Asia, Afghanistan, western and northern China (primarily Xinjiang), north-western India, south-eastern Kazakhstan, Kyrgyzstan, Tajikistan, eastern Uzbekistan, Mongolia, northern Pakistan, and south-central Russia. In 1978, 40 Siberian ibexes were introduced into the Canadian River canyon of New Mexico in the United States and a small population has been established.

Tributes

The Ladakh Scouts regiment of the Indian Army has the ibex as its mascot.

References

External links
 Siberian Ibex at Animal Diversity Web

Capra (genus)
Mammals of Asia
Mammals of Pakistan
National symbols of Kyrgyzstan
Mammals described in 1776